Vilyuysk is a town in the Sakha Republic, Russia.

Vilyuysk may also refer to:
Vilyuysk Urban Settlement, a municipal formation which includes the Town of Vilyuysk, Sakha Republic, Russia
Vilyuysk Airport, an airport in the Sakha Republic Russia
2890 Vilyujsk, a main-belt asteroid

See also
Vilyuy (disambiguation)